Alexander Pringle (9 November 1899 – 21 February 1973) was a New Zealand rugby union player. A loose forward or lock, Pringle represented Wellington at a provincial level. He played just one match for the New Zealand national side, the All Blacks, against the touring New South Wales team in 1923.

Pringle died in Christchurch on 21 February 1973, and was buried at the Ruru Lawn Cemetery.

References

1899 births
1973 deaths
Rugby union players from Wellington City
New Zealand rugby union players
New Zealand international rugby union players
Wellington rugby union players
Rugby union flankers
Rugby union locks
Burials at Ruru Lawn Cemetery